The tribe Trifolieae is one of the subdivisions of the plant family Fabaceae. It is included within the inverted repeat-lacking clade (IRLC). All of the members of this tribe are trifoliate.

These genera are recognized by the USDA:
 Medicago L. – alfalfas, medicks
 Melilotus Mill. – sweetclovers
 Ononis L. – restharrows
 Parochetus Buch.-Ham. ex D. Don – shamrock pea, blue oxalis
 Trifolium L. – clovers
 Trigonella L. – fenugreeks

References

External links

 
Fabaceae tribes